The Keane Bridge is a notable landmark of Sylhet city, Bangladesh. This bridge is called the gateway to Sylhet city.

After Earl Robert Miller, the ambassador of USA to Bangladesh visited the bridge and recommended its sole use as a pedestrian bridge, no vehicles are allowed to drive through the bridge. It is therefore the longest footover bridge in Bangladesh.

Location and description

History
This bridge was built in 1936 and is named after Sir Michael Keane who was the English Governor of Assam from 1932 to 1937.

Structure
It is made of iron and steel and looks like a bow. The bridge is 1150 feet long and 18 feet breadth. About Taka 5.6 million was spent to build the bridge.

Damage and repair
During the Bangladesh Liberation War the bridge was blown off with dynamite by the Pakistan Army and damaged. It was repaired in 1977.

Gallery

References

External links

Bridges in Bangladesh
Buildings and structures in Sylhet
Transport in Sylhet
1936 establishments in India